The Most Wonderful Time of the Year was recorded during the Mormon Tabernacle Choir's 2009 Christmas shows in the LDS Conference Center with special guests Natalie Cole and David McCullough.  The album was released on August 24, 2010 along with a concert DVD.  A national PBS special of the show aired in December 2010.

Track listing

Charts

Year-end charts

References

Tabernacle Choir albums
2010 Christmas albums
Christmas albums by American artists